Marvel Fairy Tales is a term for three volumes of comic book limited series published by Marvel Comics and written by C. B. Cebulski with art by different artists each issue. Each of these series adapts fairytales and folk tales from around the world, using analogues of famous Marvel superheroes in place of the major characters. The series were published from 2006–2008 and were, in order, X-Men Fairy Tales, Spider-Man Fairy Tales, and Avengers Fairy Tales. A potential fourth series, Fantastic Four Fairy Tales, was mentioned as "in development" by Cebulski but was never released.

X-Men Fairy Tales

X-Men Fairy Tales was the first such series, mixing folk tales with characters from X-Men comics. It ran from May 2006 to September 2006. Issue #1 quickly sold out.

Issues
 (May 17, 2006, art by Sana Takeda) is a retelling of the Japanese legend of Momotarō, with Cyclops in the lead role.
 (June 21, 2006, art by Kyle Baker) is a retelling the African folk tale of "The Tortoise and the Eagle", with the tortoise representing Professor X and the eagle Magneto.
 (July 7, 2006, art by Bill Sienkiewicz) is based on the European stories of the Brothers Grimm, with Jean Grey as a sleeping princess awoken by Cyclops. Featuring Wolverine.
 (October 2006, art by Kei Kobayashi) adapts Cajun Voodoo tales, and stars Gambit, Rogue, and Mystique.

Spider-Man Fairy Tales

Spider-Man Fairy Tales was the second of the Marvel Fairy Tales series and featured adaptations of characters from Spider-Man comics. It ran from May 2007 to October 2007.

Issues
 (July 2007, art by Ricardo Tercio) adapts Little Red Riding Hood, featuring Mary Jane Watson as Red Riding Hood and Peter as the Huntsman.
 (August 2007, art by Niko Henrichon) adapts the African legend of Kwaku Anansi, with Spider-Man as Anansi as he travels across the land fighting various elementals in the forms of the Fantastic Four.
 (September 2007, art by Kei Kobayashi) adapts a Japanese ghost story featuring Venom as a Tsuchigumo-like villain.
 (October 2007, art by Nick Dragotta and Mike Allred) a gender-reversed variation on the story of Cinderella, featuring Gwen Stacy as a princess and Peter in the Cinderella role.

Avengers Fairy Tales

Cebulski's third miniseries in the line: Avengers Fairy Tales, features characters from Avengers comics. It ran from May–August 2008.

Issues
 (May 2008, art by Joao Lemos)  adapts Peter Pan, or the Boy Who Wouldn't Grow Up, with Captain America as Peter Pan; the Scarlet Witch as Wendy; Quicksilver as her brother; the Wasp as Tinkerbell; Black Panther, Hawkeye, Iron Man, and Thor as the Lost Boys; and Klaw as Captain Hook. Pencils on this issue were done by João M. P. Lemos.
 (June 2008, art by Nuno Plati)  adapts The Adventures of Pinocchio, with The Vision as Pinocchio, Hank Pym as Mister Geppetto, and Scarlet Witch as the Fairy with Turquoise Hair.
 (August 2008, art by Takeshi Miyazawa) adapts Alice in Wonderland, with Cassandra Lang as Alice and the rest of the Young Avengers as part of the story. Also in the story are Scott Lang as the Caterpillar, Tigra as the Cheshire Cat, and Ultron and Jocasta as knights. 
 (December 2008, art by Ricardo Tercio) adapts The Wizard of Oz, with She-Hulk as Dorothy, Captain America as the Cowardly Lion, Iron Man as the Tin Man, Thor as the Scarecrow, Magneto as the Wizard, and Scarlet Witch as the Wicked Witch of the West.

Notes

References

External links
 Cover Art for X-Men Fairy Tales
 Reviews of Spider-Man Fairy Tales #1-4 at Spyder-25.com

Avengers (comics) titles
Marvel Comics limited series
Comics based on fairy tales
Spider-Man titles
X-Men titles